The Route Nationale 427 is a French road which linked Thonnance-les-Joinville to Liffol-le-Grand.

This road is 40 km long and crossed the departments of Haute-Marne and Vosges and the regions of Champagne-Ardenne and Lorraine.

In 1972, this road had been downgraded to D427.

Route 
 Thonnance-les-Joinville (Haute-Marne) (km 0)
 Suzannecourt (Haute-Marne) (km 1)
 Poissons (Haute-Marne) (km 5)
 Noncourt-sur-le-Rongeant (Haute-Marne) (km 7)
 Thonnance-les-Moulins (Haute-Marne) (km 11)
 Germay (Haute-Marne) (km 17)
 Trampot (Vosges) (km 26)
 Aillianville (Haute-Marne) (km 30)
 Liffol-le-Grand (Vosges) (km 40)

427